Stenolebias  is a genus of fish in the family Rivulidae. These relatively rare annual killifish are endemic to seasonal waters in the Pantanal in Brazil.

Species
Stenolebias and the closely related Maratecoara, Papiliolebias, Pituna and Plesiolebias form a clade, Plesiolebiasini.

There are currently two recognized species in Stenolebias:

 Stenolebias bellus W. J. E. M. Costa, 1995
 Stenolebias damascenoi (W. J. E. M. Costa, 1991)

References

Rivulidae
Freshwater fish genera